Ludmila Jankovcová (née Stračovská; 8 August 1897, Kutná Hora – 5 September 1990, Plzeň) was a Czech politician. 

She was appointed Minister of Industry in 1947, and Deputy Prime Minister in 1954.

References

1897 births
1990 deaths
People from Kutná Hora
20th-century Czech women politicians
Government ministers of Czechoslovakia
Charter 77 signatories